Darsanalaya is an Indian Christian ashram under the territory of Archdiocese of Delhi and belongs to one of the mission centers of S H Province of CMI Congregation. Action in Contemplation is the concept of Darsanalaya Ashram. 

People from all walks, irrespective of caste, creed and faith are behind the functions of the Darsanalaya and the peaceful ambiance of Ashram. All those who visit Darsanalaya are well absorbed into this ambiance irrespective of age / health. 

Hope radiates in the gentle, calm and serene surroundings. Darsanalaya Ashram  is committed to the Vision ‘With the People for Goodness’ and Mission to ‘Create Equality, Solidarity and Friendship among People’.

History
After six years of initiation, the centre has introduced a dynamic new approach to serve the people. 

Compassionate and friendly organizational skills of the missionaries well accepted by the people and Darsanalaya Ashram become an intimate centre for the local community. 

They have long years of reflection, meditation and knowledge of herbal treatment. They can easily adopt and practice social work, community development, a Students' Scholarship Program, an AIDS Awareness Campaign, yoga therapy, herbal treatment, etc.

Overview
Darsanalaya Ashram started with the same spirit of Jesus Christ and Blessed Chavara. It is a place of silence and solitude. The Ashram vicinity is powered with spiritual vibrations. This is an Ashram where people can come from all lifestyles irrespective of caste and creed. It is an Indian Christian Ashram for the search and social reformation in collaboration with other religions and religious sects.

Location
Darsanalaya Ashram is located in a village area on the banks of the Yamuna River. It is bounded by the National Capital Territory of Delhi National Capital Territory of Delhi on its north, Gurgaon Gurgaon District on the west, and Uttar Pradesh Uttar Pradesh State on its east across the Yamuna River. There are around 27 villages around this ashram.

Ethnic diversity
The village population consists of different castes and traditions. The main classes of people in this area are Jats, Rajputs, Brahmins, Ahirs, Banias, Harijans and Gujars. Almost all belong to agricultural communities. There are also categories like village artisans, craftsmen and certain other menials who helped in the agricultural operations. These included the village blacksmith, the carpenter, the oil man, the barber, the washer man, the village potter and some others.

Ambiance
Darsanalaya keeps an atmosphere of silence in and around the ashram vicinity. The people who visit the ashram enjoy the simple vegetarian food and fresh air with yoga and meditation in the atmosphere of silence. The ashram has developed an idea of Garbhagraha Anubhava meditation (Womb Experience). Dr. Aji Sebastian the visionary and the Acharya (Director) of the Ashram were in silence for a year in Saccidananda Ashram, at Narsinghpur, M.P. state of India, for the experiment of Garbhagraha Anubhava.

In this busy world, people are in stress and confusion and they always run here and there for solace. When a human being was in the womb of its mother, it was alone in its solitude. In this busy world, people forget the cause of their life, i.e. solitude and silence. Darsanalaya Ashram is a place to repose in the busy schedule of this world.

Ashram inmates observe and study the problems and issues of the world. The problems relate to children, women, rich and poor, healthy and weak, family and society; each individual in the community is responsible for the things that happen in the society.

Darsanalaya promotes the eco-friendly life style and raises a voice against social evils like child labor, HIV/AIDS discrimination and its stigma, sex imbalance, abortion, women feticide, poverty, and sexual abuse, while trying to promote value-based education in rural and urban areas, religious harmony and ecumenical fellowship, creating equality, solidarity and friendship among people.

Darsanalaya Ashram and its activities originate from the deeper levels of meditation in solitude and silence. The divine energy that proceeds from meditation moves to social activities. Many people from far and near are members of the Darsanalaya family, and behind the Darsanalaya Ashram's humanitarian and developmental activities. The vision of the ashram been fulfilled, ‘with the people for the goodness’.

Activities
Activities of Darsanalaya Ashram  are governed by the registered body of the Darsanalaya Society, which is a Charitable Society registered under the Societies Registration Act, XXI of 1860 (Reg. No. S-55211 of 2006) by the Darsanalaya Ashram with a view to plan, organize, unify and implement socio-economic, educational and healthcare activities of the Darsanalaya Ashram. The all-round welfare of those who depend on agriculture, the working class, the poor and the indigent, irrespective of caste, creed or religion is the goal of the society.

The society had registered for the smooth functions of the Darsanalaya Ashram's charitable and humanitarian activities. The society tries its best to collaborate with like-minded people in this field and cherish the activities of society by teamwork. Darsanalaya is associating with government and other local NGOs of the area for social enhancement. The society is involved in different types of awareness programs through art and media, especially on HIV/AIDS discrimination and its stigma, sex imbalance, abortion, women feticide, poverty, and sexual abuse, and trying to promote value based education in rural and urban areas, religious harmony etc. The society is involved in medical promotion through giving awareness training and treating people with different types of herbs. It is also involved in the construction of a new generation through classes, and academic support to children. It is actively involved in inter-religious and ecumenical programs.

Institute
Darsanalaya Institute of Alternative Medicines and Research is an innovation of Darsanalaya Society and it is for promotion and research on herbal medicines. It has affiliated with the Indian Board of Alternative Medicines. As part of the propagation of healing power of herbal medicines, it arranges training programs in the Institute and in different states in association with local NGOs and government agencies.

Arogyalaya
Darsana Arogalaya is a 15-bedded Arogalaya (hospital) where an herbal system of medicine (Sheethali Chikithsa) is practiced. People from different parts of the country and abroad visit the Arogalaya for treatment. It has consulting centers in different parts of the country.

Navadarsan
The inspiration for Nava Darsan is from the words of APJ Abdul Kalam, former President of India.
"Dream, Dream, Dream 
Dreams transform into thoughts
And thoughts result in action" (Ignited Minds, P.1)

The idea of the Nava Darsan (New Vision), value-added education program originates from the group discussion of experts in the field of academics, social scientists, social workers, educators, artists, film directors, politicians and principals of CBSE schools. The discussion resulted in formulating the objectives for the Nava Darshan Education Program.

The aims and objectives of the Nava Darshan Education Program:

•	To promote value based classes.
•	To give clear cut sex education.
•	To find out the leadership qualities of the children.
•	To create a stage for interaction and to widen their world.
•	To create a sensitive generation for the future.
•	To shape the youngsters into persons with a strong character and outgoing personality.
•	To give dreams for the youngsters.
•	To find out the talents of students.
•	To provide counseling, yoga Training, and Meditation techniques to the children to reduce the stress and to increase the concentration and meaning in life.
•	To make a better rapport between the parents, teachers and children.
•	To conduct animation programs for teachers and parents through the schools.

There are thousands of schools in government and private sectors. Years of experience with the students and parents made a few issues clear, related to this field. Stress among the students, identity crisis, broken family relationships, emotionally imbalanced teachers, the aimless life etc. were a few burning issues of study findings.

The society sponsors over a hundred brilliant and poor children from the villages. It is not only to provide a little financial support, but to give formation to these children though seminars, talent shows, sports and games etc. Darsanalaya provides sponsorship to one hundred and thirty students for their studies from 13 schools around the Ashram. Nava Darshan aspirants have regular get-togethers, classes, seminars, sport and literary competitions etc.

References

External links
 Documentary Companion by Asok Sadan
 Documentary on Darsanalaya by V K Sreeraman
 Article "Medical Pilgrimage" by Dr. Saju Chackalackal
 CANDID CORNER "Jesus in Dharma" by A. J. Philip Issue 15, 6–12 April 2009
 Ashram Priest Trains Filipinos to heal poor
 Carmelite Priest Honored for his healing work

Discalced Carmelite Order
Catholic spirituality
Roman Catholic churches in India
Community development
Rural community development
Christianity in Delhi